Rejean Tramain "Boogie" Ellis Jr. (born December 12, 2000) is an American college basketball player for the USC Trojans of the Pac-12 Conference. He previously played for the Memphis Tigers.

High school career
Ellis attended Mission Bay High School for his four years in high school.

Recruiting
On November 9, 2018, Ellis committed to play at Duke University. On May 2, 2019, he requested Duke to release his letter of intent allowing him to choose other schools to attend. He later explained that he wanted to be the starting point guard for the Blue Devils and Tre Jones returning impacted his decision. On May 13, 2019, Ellis committed to play at the University of Memphis.

College career
Ellis scored a game-high 21 points on 7-of-11 shooting in a 83–78 win over NC State. He was subsequently named American Athletic Conference freshman of the week on December 2, 2019. He struggled shooting the ball in December and was relegated to a bench role. Ellis averaged 8.0 points and 3.3 rebounds per game as a freshman. On November 25, 2020, Ellis scored a career-high 24 points in a game against the Saint Mary's Gaels. On March 31, 2021, Ellis entered the transfer portal. On April 12, he announced that he would transfer to the University of Southern California. Ellis was named Honorable Mention All-Pac-12 as a junior.

Career statistics

College

|-
| style="text-align:left;"| 2019–20
| style="text-align:left;"| Memphis
| 31 || 27 || 24.5 || .330 || .324 || .685 || 3.3 || 1.5 || 1.3 || .1 || 8.0
|-
| style="text-align:left;"| 2020–21
| style="text-align:left;"| Memphis
| 28 || 15 || 23.4 || .401 || .386 || .657 || 2.1 || 1.5 || 1.1 || .2 || 10.2
|-
| style="text-align:left;"| 2021–22
| style="text-align:left;"| USC
| 33 || 33 || 29.8 || .417 || .376 || .798 || 3.3 || 2.4 || .8 || .2 || 12.5
|- class="sortbottom"
| style="text-align:center;" colspan="2"| Career
| 92 || 75 || 26.0 || .388 || .365 || .718 || 2.9 || 1.8 || 1.0 || .2 || 10.3

References

External links
USC Trojans bio
Memphis Tigers bio

2000 births
Living people
21st-century African-American sportspeople
American men's basketball players
African-American basketball players
Basketball players from San Diego
Memphis Tigers men's basketball players
Shooting guards
USC Trojans men's basketball players

American sportspeople of Filipino descent